Ismail Al-Zaabi (Arabic:إسماعيل الزعابي) (born 14 July 2001) is an Emirati footballer. He currently plays as a midfielder for Al-Wahda.

Career
Al-Zaabi started his career at Al-Wahda and is a product of the Al-Wahda's youth system. On 18 October 2019, It has been suspended 4 matches due to his absence from U20 UAE camp without prior excuse . On 11 December 2019, Al-Zaabi made his professional debut for Al-Wahda against Shabab Al-Ahli in the Pro League .

References

External links
 

2001 births
Living people
Emirati footballers
Al Wahda FC players
UAE Pro League players
Association football midfielders
Place of birth missing (living people)